Cassandra or Kassandra (Ancient Greek: Κασσάνδρα, also , and sometimes referred to as Alexandra) in Greek mythology was a Trojan priestess dedicated to the god Apollo and fated by him to utter true prophecies but never to be believed. In modern usage her name is employed as a rhetorical device to indicate a person whose accurate prophecies, generally of impending disaster, are not believed.

Cassandra was a daughter of King Priam and Queen Hecuba of Troy. Her elder brother was Hector, the hero of the Greek-Trojan war. The older and most common versions of the myth state that she was admired by the god Apollo, who sought to win her love by means of the gift of seeing the future. According to Aeschylus, she promised him her favours, but after receiving the gift, she went back on her word. As the enraged Apollo could not revoke a divine power, he added to it the curse that nobody would believe her prophecies. In other sources, such as Hyginus and Pseudo-Apollodorus, Cassandra broke no promise to Apollo but rather the power of foresight was given to her as an enticement to enter into a romantic engagement, the curse being added only when it failed to produce the result desired by the god.

Later versions on the contrary describe her falling asleep in a temple, where snakes licked (or whispered into) her ears which enabled her to hear the future.

Etymology
Hjalmar Frisk (Griechisches Etymologisches Wörterbuch, Heidelberg, 1960–1970) notes "unexplained etymology", citing "various hypotheses" found in Wilhelm Schulze, Edgar Howard Sturtevant, J. Davreux, and Albert Carnoy. R. S. P. Beekes cites García Ramón's derivation of the name from the Proto-Indo-European root *(s)kend- "raise". The Online Etymology Dictionary states "though the second element looks like a fem. form of Greek andros "of man, male human being." Watkins suggests PIE *(s)kand- "to shine" as source of second element. The name also has been connected to kekasmai "to surpass, excel."

Description 
Cassandra was described by the chronicler Malalas in his account of the Chronography as "shortish, round-faced, white, mannish figure, good nose, good eyes, dark pupils, blondish, curly, good neck, bulky breasts, small feet, calm, noble, priestly, an accurate prophet foreseeing everything, practicing hard, virgin". Meanwhile, in the account of Dares the Phrygian, she was illustrated as ". . .of moderate stature, round-mouthed, and auburn-haired. Her eyes flashed. She knew the future."

Biography

Cassandra was one of the many children born to the king and queen of Troy, Priam and Hecuba. She is the fraternal twin sister of Helenus, as well as the sister to Hector and Paris. One of the oldest and most common versions of her myth states that Cassandra was admired for her beauty and intelligence by the god Apollo, who sought to win her with the gift to see the future. According to Aeschylus, Cassandra promised Apollo favors, but, after receiving the gift, went back on her word and refused Apollo. Since the enraged Apollo could not revoke a divine power, he added a curse that nobody would believe Cassandra's prophecies.

Mythology
Cassandra appears in texts written by Homer, Virgil, Aeschylus and Euripides.  Each author depicts her prophetic powers differently.

In Homer's work, Cassandra is mentioned a total of four times "as a virgin daughter of Priam, as bewailing Hector’s death, as chosen by Agamemnon as his slave mistress after the sack of Troy, and as killed by Clytemnestra over Agamemnon’s corpse after Clytemnestra murders him on his return home."

In Virgil's work, Cassandra appears in  book two of his epic poem titled Aeneid, with her powers of prophecy restored. In Book 2 of the Aenied, unlike Homer, Virgil presents Cassandra as having fallen into a mantic state and her prophecies reflect it. 
Likewise Seneca the Younger, in his play Agamemnon, has prophesize why Agamemnon deserves the death he got:Quid me vocatis sospitem solam e meis, umbrae meorum? te sequor, tota pater Troia sepulte; frater, auxilium Phrygum terrorque Danaum, non ego antiquum decus video aut calentes ratibus ambustis manus, sed lacera membra et saucios vinclo gravi illos lacertos. te sequor… (Ag. 741–747)

Why do you call me, the lone survivor of my family, My shades? I follow you, father buried with all of Troy; Brother, bulwark of Trojans, terrorizer of Greeks, I do not see your beauty of old or hands warmed by burnt ships, But your lacerated limbs and those famous shoulders savaged By heavy chains. I follow you…Later on in Seneca's work, this behavior is reflected in acts 4 and 5 as "Her mantic vision in act 4 will be supplemented by a further (in)sight into what is going on inside the palace in act 5 when she becomes a quasi-messenger and provides a meticulous account of Agamemnon’s murder in the bath: 'I see and I am there and I enjoy it, no false vision deceives my eyes: let’s watch' (video et intersum et fruor, / imago visus dubia non fallit meos: / spectemus.)"

Gift of prophecy
Cassandra was given the gift of prophecy, but was also cursed by the god Apollo so that her true prophecies would not be believed. Many versions of the myth relate that she incurred the god's wrath by refusing him sexual favours after promising herself to him in exchange for the power of prophecy. In Aeschylus' Agamemnon, she bemoans her relationship with Apollo:
Apollo, Apollo!
God of all ways, but only Death's to me,
Once and again, O thou, Destroyer named,
Thou hast destroyed me, thou, my love of old!

And she acknowledges her fault:
I consented [marriage] to Loxias [Apollo] but broke my word. ... Ever since that fault I could persuade no one of anything.

Latin author Hyginus in Fabulae says:

Louise Bogan, an American poet, writes that another way Cassandra, as well as her twin brother Helenus, had earned their prophetic powers: "she and her brother Helenus were left overnight in the temple of the Thymbraean Apollo. No reason has been advanced for this night in the temple; perhaps it was a ritual routinely performed by everyone. When their parents looked in on them the next morning, the children were entwined with serpents, which flicked their tongues into the children's ears. This enabled Cassandra and Helenus to divine the future." It would not be until Cassandra is much older that Apollo appears in the same temple and tried to seduce Cassandra, who rejects his advances, and curses her by making her prophecies not be believed.

Her cursed gift from Apollo became an endless pain and frustration to her. She was seen as a liar and a madwoman by her family and by the Trojan people. Because of this, her father, Priam, had locked her away in a chamber and guarded her like the madwoman she was believed to be.  Though Cassandra made many predictions that went unbelieved, the one prophecy that was believed was that of Paris being her abandoned brother.

Cassandra and the Fall of Troy

Before the fall of Troy
Before the fall of Troy took place, Cassandra foresaw that if Paris goes to Sparta and brings Helen back as his wife, the arrival of Helen will spark the downfall and destruction of Troy during the Trojan War. Despite the prophecy and ignoring Cassandra's warning, Paris still went to Sparta and returned with Helen. While the people of Troy rejoiced, Cassandra, angry with Helen's arrival, furiously snatched away Helen's golden veil and tore at her hair.

In Virgil's epic poem, the Aeneid,  Cassandra warned the Trojans about the Greeks hiding inside the Trojan Horse, Agamemnon's death, her own demise at the hands of Aegisthus and Clytemnestra, her mother Hecuba's fate, Odysseus's ten-year wanderings before returning to his home, and the murder of Aegisthus and Clytemnestra by the latter's children Electra and Orestes. Cassandra predicted that her cousin Aeneas would escape during the fall of Troy and found a new nation in Rome.

During the fall of Troy
Coroebus and Othronus came to the aid of Troy during the Trojan War out of love for Cassandra and in exchange for her hand in marriage, but both were killed. According to one account, Priam offered Cassandra to Telephus’s son Eurypylus, in order to induce Eurypylus to fight on the side of the Trojans. Cassandra was also the first to see the body of her brother Hector being brought back to the city.In The Fall of Troy, told by Quintus Smyrnaeus, Cassandra attempted to warn the Trojan people that Greek warriors were hiding in the Trojan Horse while they were celebrating their victory over the Greeks with feasting. Disbelieving Cassandra, the Trojans resorted to calling her names and hurling insults at her. Attempting to prove herself right, Cassandra took an axe in one hand and a burning torch in the other, and ran towards the Trojan Horse, intent on destroying the Greeks herself, but the Trojans stopped her. The Greeks hiding inside the Horse were relieved, but alarmed by how clearly she had divined their plan.

At the fall of Troy, Cassandra sought shelter in the temple of Athena. There she embraced the wooden statue of Athena in supplication for her protection, but was abducted and brutally raped by Ajax the Lesser. Cassandra clung so tightly to the statue of the goddess that Ajax knocked it from its stand as he dragged her away. The actions of Ajax were a sacrilege because Cassandra was a supplicant at the sanctuary, and under the protection of the goddess Athena and Ajax further defiled the temple by raping Cassandra. In Apollodorus chapter 6, section 6, Ajax's death comes at the hands of both Athena and Poseidon "Athena threw a thunderbolt at the ship of Ajax; and when the ship went to pieces he made his way safe to a rock, and declared that he was saved in spite of the intention of Athena. But Poseidon smote the rock with his trident and split it, and Ajax fell into the sea and perished; and his body, being washed up, was buried by Thetis in Myconos".

In some versions, Cassandra intentionally left a chest behind in Troy, with a curse on whichever Greek opened it first. Inside the chest was an image of Dionysus, made by Hephaestus and presented to the Trojans by Zeus. It was given to the Greek leader Eurypylus as a part of his share of the victory spoils of Troy. When he opened the chest and saw the image of the god, he went mad.

The aftermath of Troy and Cassandra's death
Once Troy had fallen, Cassandra was taken as a pallake (concubine) by King Agamemnon of Mycenae.  While he was away at war, Agamemnon's wife, Clytemnestra, had taken Aegisthus as her lover.  Cassandra and Agamemnon were later killed by both Clytemnestra and Aegisthus.  Various sources state that Cassandra and Agamemnon had twin boys, Teledamus and Pelops, who were murdered by Aegisthus.

The final resting place of Cassandra is either in Amyclae or Mycenae.  Statues of Cassandra exist both in Amyclae and across the Peleponnese peninsula from Mycenae in Leuctra. In Mycenae, German business man and pioneer archeologist Heinrich Schliemann discovered in Grave Circle A the graves of Cassandra and Agamemnon and telegraphed back to King George of Greece:With great joy I announce to Your Majesty that I have discovered the tombs which the tradition proclaimed by Pausanias indicates to be the graves of Agamemnon, Cassandra, Eurymedon and their companions, all slain at a banquet by Clytemnestra and her lover Aegisthos.However, it was later discovered that the graves predated the Trojan War by at least 300 years.

Agamemnon by Aeschylus

The play Agamemnon from Aeschylus's trilogy Oresteia depicts the king treading the scarlet cloth laid down for him, and walking offstage to his death. After the chorus's ode of foreboding, time is suspended in Cassandra's "mad scene". She has been onstage, silent and ignored. Her madness that is unleashed now is not the physical torment of other characters in Greek tragedy, such as in Euripides' Heracles or Sophocles' Ajax.

According to author Seth Schein, two further familiar descriptions of her madness are that of Heracles in The Women of Trachis or Io in Prometheus Bound. She speaks, disconnectedly and transcendent, in the grip of her psychic possession by Apollo, witnessing past and future events. Schein says, "She evokes the same awe, horror and pity as do schizophrenics". Cassandra is one of those "who often combine deep, true insight with utter helplessness, and who retreat into madness."

Eduard Fraenkel remarked on the powerful contrasts between declaimed and sung dialogue in this scene. The frightened and respectful chorus are unable to comprehend her. She goes to her inevitable offstage murder by Clytemnestra with full knowledge of what is to befall her.

See also 

 Apollo archetype
 Novikov self-consistency principle
 The Boy Who Cried Wolf
 Tiresias
 Voice in the Wilderness

Notes

References

Primary sources
 Homer. Iliad XXIV, 697–706; Odyssey XI, 405–434;
 Aeschylus. Agamemnon
 Euripides. The Trojan Women; Electra
 Bibliotheca III, xii, 5; Epitome V, 17–22; VI, 23
 Virgil. Aeneid II, 246–247, 341–346, 403–408
 Lycophron. Alexandra
 Triphiodorus: The Sack of Troy
 Quintus Smyrnaeus: Posthomerica

Further reading 
 Clarke, Lindsay. The Return from Troy. HarperCollins (2005). .
 Marion Zimmer Bradley. The Firebrand. 
 Patacsil, Par. Cassandra. In The Likhaan Book of Plays 1997–2003. Villanueva and Nadera, eds. University of the Philippines Press (2006). 
 Ukrainka, Lesya. "Cassandra". Original Publication: Lesya Ukrainka. Life and work by Constantine Bida. Selected works, translated by Vera Rich. Toronto: Published for the Women's Council of the Ukrainian Canadian Committee by University of Toronto Press (1968). pp. 181–239
 Schapira, Laurie L. The Cassandra Complex: Living with Disbelief: A Modern Perspective on Hysteria. Toronto: Inner City Books  (1988). .

External links
 
 

Classical oracles
Mythological Greek seers
Greek mythological priestesses
Mythological rape victims
Princesses in Greek mythology
Trojans
Children of Priam
Women of Apollo
Women of the Trojan war
Characters in the Aeneid
Metamorphoses characters